Lierna is a comune in the province of Lecco in Lombardy, in north-west Italy.

Lierna borders the comuni of Esino Lario, Mandello del Lario, Oliveto Lario and Varenna.

History

The first mention of Lierna dates to 854 AD, but Roman remains, including a mosaic floor now in the Palazzo Belgioioso of Lecco, attest to much earlier settlement. The name of the village may be of Roman or of Celtic origin. Between 1035 and 1202 it was a feud of the Monastery of San Dionigi in Milan. Lierna was contested between Milan and Como, and between the Della Torre and Visconti families. Lierna became a comune in 1743, when it was separated from that of Mandello.

In 1927 the Milanese sculptor Giannino Castiglioni opened a studio at his house in Lierna. He died in Lierna on 27 August 1971. He left some preparatory plaster casts to the comune; a museum to house them is under construction.

In 1933 an incomplete fossil of  Lariosaurus balsami, a nothosaurid from the Middle Triassic (circa 240 million years ago) of which the first example was discovered at Perledo, some 10 km north of Lierna, was found in a quarry in the frazione of Grumo. It is now in the Museo di Storia Naturale in the Palazzo Belgioioso of Lecco.

See also
Lierna Castle

References

Cities and towns in Lombardy